Lake Fork is an unincorporated community in Valley County, Idaho, United States.

References

Unincorporated communities in Valley County, Idaho
Unincorporated communities in Idaho